The 1999 FIS Freestyle World Ski Championships were held between March 10th and March 14th at the Meiringen-Hasliberg ski resort in Switzerland.  The World Championships featured both men's and women's events in the Moguls, Aerials, Dual Moguls and Acro Skiing. This was to be the last appearance of Acro Skiing at the World Championships.

Results

Men's results

Moguls

Aerials

Dual Moguls

Acro Skiing

Women's results

Moguls

Aerials

Dual Moguls

Acro Skiing

References

External links
 FIS Freestyle Skiing Home
 Results from the FIS

1999
1999 in Swiss sport
1999 in freestyle skiing
Freestyle skiing competitions in Switzerland